C. Pasupathy Pandian (1960-2012) was a South Indian politician. He was a member of the Pattali Makkal Katchi political party of the Tamil Nadu, before creating a party of his own.

Early life 
Pandian was born in Alangar Thattu village in Tuticorin district in the Indian state of Tamil Nadu.

Career 
Pandian was a member of the Pattali Makkal Katchi political party of the Tamil Nadu, before creating a party of his own. 

He was murdered on 10 January 2012. He was hacked to death by a gang at his residence in Nandhavanathupatti in Dindigul district. Special teams were constituted to find his assailants. The police took many persons for questioning including Pandian's bodyguards, who were with him at the time of the murder. Arulanandham hails from Mullakadu, which is near Moolakarai, the native place of 'Venkatesa Pannaiyar'. Two men surrendered in the Valliyoor court in connection with the murder. Venkatesh Pannayar was an Industrialist. Police are investigating if Pandian's murder was committed in retaliation for the murders in Pannaiyar's group, including Sivasubramania Nadar, grandfather of Subash Pannaiyar (cousin of Pannaiyar), who was murdered in 1990, with Pandian named as an accused. Police sources say that enmity within Pasupathy's family was not ruled out, as his own bodyguards were interrogated.

Though the southern districts remained calm on Thursday, police pickets were placed in sensitive places like Paramakudi, Kadaladi, Kamudhi in Ramanathapuram among others. Patrolling was intensified in these places.

References 

2012 deaths
Tamil Nadu politicians
1960 births